The 1978 Grand Prix motorcycle racing season was the 30th F.I.M. Road Racing World Championship season.

Season summary
There was an air of excitement at the start of the 1978 Grand Prix season. The popularity of defending champion Barry Sheene had boosted the appeal of motorcycle racing into the realm of the mass marketing media. The arrival of Kenny Roberts from America added to the anticipation. A young Spaniard, Ricardo Tormo took five of seven rounds to claim the 50 cc title for Bultaco. Italy's Eugenio Lazzarini won the 125 cc crown aboard an MBA. South Africa's Kork Ballington pulled off an impressive double, winning the 250 cc and 350 cc titles for Kawasaki, matching the double championships of Walter Villa in 1976 and Mike Hailwood in 1967.

In the 500 cc class, Suzuki returned with its defending world champion, Barry Sheene, along with teammates Teuvo Lansivuori, Pat Hennen and Wil Hartog. Yamaha's official factory team entered former 350 cc world champions Johnny Cecotto and Takazumi Katayama. Lacking a competitive bike with which to compete against Harley Davidson in the AMA Grand National Championship, Yamaha's American subsidiary decided to send its former AMA champion Roberts to compete in the 250 cc, 500 cc and Formula 750 F.I.M. road racing world championships. Roberts also secured the financial backing of the Goodyear tire company.

Sheene opened the season with a win in the Venezuelan Grand Prix but then fell ill to a virus that weakened him for the first part of the year. Roberts won the 250 cc Grand Prix in Venezuela but then suffered a mechanical failure in the 500 cc race. American Pat Hennen won the second round at the Spanish Grand Prix with Roberts finishing in second place and Sheene relegated to fifth place. Roberts then won his first-ever 500 cc Grand Prix with a win at the Austrian Grand Prix, quickly followed by two more victories in France and Italy to take the championship points lead. Hennen's promising career was cut short when he suffered head injuries while competing in the Isle of Man TT during a break in the Grand Prix season schedule.

Cecotto won the Dutch TT with Roberts finishing ahead of a resurgent Sheene in third place. Hartog would claim the Belgian Grand Prix for Suzuki with Roberts and Sheene once again finishing in second and third places respectively. At the 1978 Swedish Grand Prix, Roberts crashed during practice for the 250 cc race, sustaining a concussion and a thumb injury. Shaken up by the accident, he could do no better than seventh place in the 500 cc race, while Sheene won the race to close the points gap on championship points leader Roberts. Hartog won his second Grand Prix of the season with a victory at the Finnish Grand Prix, while the two championship leaders, Roberts and Sheene failed to finish the race.

The two championship contenders arrived in England for the British Grand Prix with only three points separating them. The race ended in controversy when torrential rains during the race, along with pit stops for tire changes by both Roberts and Sheene, created confusion among official scorers. Eventually, Roberts was declared the winner with Sheene being awarded third place behind privateer Steve Manship, who did not stop for a tire change.

The title fight between Roberts and Sheene went down to the final race of the season, the German Grand Prix held at the daunting, 14.2-mile-long (22.8 km) Nürburgring racetrack. Suzuki privateer, Virginio Ferrari, won the first Grand Prix of his career, while Roberts finished in third place, ahead of Sheene in fourth place to claim the first world championship for an American rider in Grand Prix road racing history. Cecotto claimed third place in the final championship standings.

1978 Grand Prix season calendar

Final standings

500cc standings

350cc standings

250cc standings

125cc standings

50cc standings

References

 Büla, Maurice & Schertenleib, Jean-Claude (2001). Continental Circus 1949-2000. Chronosports S.A. 

Grand Prix motorcycle racing seasons
Grand Prix motorcycle racing season